David Maurice Robinson (born August 6, 1965) is an American former professional basketball player who played for the San Antonio Spurs in the National Basketball Association (NBA) from 1989 to 2003, and minority owner of the Spurs. Nicknamed "the Admiral" for his service with the U.S. Navy, Robinson was a 10-time NBA All-Star, the 1995 NBA MVP, a two-time NBA champion (1999 and 2003), a two-time Olympic Gold Medal winner (1992, 1996), a two-time Naismith Memorial Basketball Hall of Fame inductee (2009 for his individual career, 2010 as a member of the 1992 United States men's Olympic basketball team), and a two-time U.S. Olympic Hall of Fame inductee (2008 individually, 2009 as a member of the 1992 Olympic team). He was honored as one of the league's all-time players by being named to the NBA 50th Anniversary (1996) and 75th Anniversary Teams (2021). He is widely considered one of the greatest centers in both college basketball and NBA history.

Early life

Robinson was born in Key West, Florida, the second child of Ambrose and Freda Robinson. Since Robinson's father was in the U.S. Navy, the family moved frequently. After his father retired from the Navy, the family settled in Woodbridge, Virginia, where Robinson excelled in school and in most sports, except basketball. Robinson attended Osbourn Park High School in Manassas, Virginia, just outside Washington, D.C., where Robinson's father was working as an engineer.

He had not played organized basketball or attended any basketball camps, but the school's basketball coach added him to the team, and Robinson earned all-area and all-district honors but generated little interest among college basketball coaches.

Robinson graduated from Osbourn Park in 1983. He achieved a score of 1320 on the SAT, and chose to attend the United States Naval Academy, where he would major in mathematics and play on the basketball team. Assuming that he was unlikely to grow much more, the academy's superintendent granted him a waiver.

College basketball career and military service

Robinson is widely considered to be the best basketball player in Naval Academy history. He chose the jersey number 50 after his idol Ralph Sampson. He began college with no expectations of playing in the NBA, but in Robinson's final two years he was a consensus All-American and won college basketball's two most prestigious player awards, the Naismith and Wooden Awards, as a Naval Academy first classman (senior). In 1986, Robinson led Navy, a number seven seed, within a game of the Final Four before falling to Duke in the East Regional Final. Robinson played his first three years for the Midshipmen under Paul Evans (who left Navy to coach at Pitt) and his senior season under former University of Georgia interim head coach Pete Herrmann. Upon graduation, he became eligible for the 1987 NBA draft and was selected by the San Antonio Spurs with the first overall pick; however, the Spurs had to wait two years because he had to fulfill his active-duty obligation with the Navy.

Robinson considered leaving the academy after his second year, before incurring an obligation to serve on active duty. He decided to stay after discussing with the Superintendent the likelihood that his height would prevent him from serving at sea as an unrestricted line officer, which would be detrimental to his naval career, and might make it impossible for him to receive a commission at all. As a compromise, Secretary of the Navy John Lehman allowed Robinson to train for and receive a commission as a staff officer in the Civil Engineer Corps. As a result, Robinson was commissioned in the Naval Reserve and was required to serve only an initial active-duty obligation of two years. After graduating from the Naval Academy, Robinson became a civil engineering officer at the Naval Submarine Base Kings Bay in Georgia. He was regularly featured in recruiting materials for the service. Despite the nickname "Admiral", Robinson's actual rank upon fulfilling his service commitment was Lieutenant (junior grade).

Professional career

San Antonio Spurs (1989–2003)

Rookie of the Year, DPOY award and scoring title (1989–1994)
Since he had not signed a contract, NBA regulations stated that Robinson could have reentered the draft after his naval service. Although there was speculation that he might choose not to sign with the Spurs, Robinson agreed to move to San Antonio for the 1989–90 season, but the Spurs agreed to pay him as much as the average of the salaries of the two highest-paid players in the league each year, or release him to free agency.

The Spurs had spent the second half of the 1980s as an also-ran, bottoming out in 1988–89 season with a 21–61 record, the worst in franchise history at the time. While it was widely thought that the Spurs would become respectable again once Robinson arrived, no one expected what happened in his rookie season. Robinson led the Spurs to the greatest single-season turnaround in NBA history at the time (a record the Spurs themselves broke in 1997–98 season, after drafting Tim Duncan, which was then broken by the Boston Celtics in the 2007–08 NBA season). The Spurs leaped to a record of 56–26 for a remarkable 35 game improvement. They advanced to the second round of the Western Conference playoffs where they lost in seven games to the eventual conference champion Portland Trail Blazers. Following the 1989–90 season, he was unanimously named the NBA Rookie of the Year, and subsequently Sega produced a game featuring him entitled David Robinson's Supreme Court. The Spurs made the playoffs seven more seasons in a row. In the 1991–92 season Robinson led the league in blocks and was named the NBA Defensive Player of the Year. Robinson also made the 1992 US Olympic Dream Team that won the gold medal in Barcelona. During the 1993–94 season, he became locked in a duel for the NBA scoring title with Shaquille O'Neal, scoring 71 points (breaking George Gervin's single-game franchise record of 63) against the Los Angeles Clippers to win it. In that season, Robinson averaged a career-high 29.8 points per game, 10.7 rebounds per game, career-high 4.8 assists per game and 3.3 blocks per game.

MVP title, playoff upsets and injury (1994–1998)
Robinson went on to win the MVP trophy in 1995, and in 1996 he was named one of the 50 Greatest Players in NBA History. Still, from 1991 to 1996, Robinson was thwarted in his quest to claim the one prize that had eluded him: an NBA title. During that span the Spurs were eliminated from the playoffs by the Warriors, Suns (twice), Jazz (twice), and Rockets. The loss against the Rockets was particularly painful for Robinson because it occurred in the Western Conference Finals with Robinson playing head-to-head against his chief rival, Hakeem Olajuwon. By his own admission, Robinson was outplayed by Olajuwon in the series, their only meetings in post-season play. In a LIFE magazine story, he seemed perplexed. “Solve Hakeem?” said Robinson. “You don’t solve Hakeem.”

Early in the 1997 season, Robinson's dreams of becoming a champion seemed to vanish when he hurt his back in the preseason. He finally returned in December, but six games later broke his foot in a home game against the Miami Heat, and ended up missing the rest of the regular season. As a result of the injury to Robinson and other key players (most notably Sean Elliott, who missed more than half the season), the Spurs finished the season with a dismal 20–62 record. However, his injury proved to be a blessing in disguise. Despite having only the third-worst record in the league, the Spurs won the NBA Draft Lottery—and with it, the first pick in the next year's NBA draft. They used that pick to select Tim Duncan out of Wake Forest University, who was, after a few years, the final key to Robinson's quest for an NBA title.

Championship season (1998–1999) 

The later years of Robinson's career were plagued by back ailments.
Before the start of the 1998–99 season, the NBA owners and NBA commissioner David Stern locked out the NBA Players' Association to force negotiations on a new Collective Bargaining Agreement. This lockout lasted for 202 days, well into the regular NBA season, before an agreement was finally reached. After playing a truncated 50-game season, the Spurs finished with an NBA-best record of 37–13, giving them the home-court advantage throughout the playoffs.

The Spurs blitzed through the first three rounds of the NBA playoffs, beating the Minnesota Timberwolves, Los Angeles Lakers, and Portland Trail Blazers by a combined record of 11–1 to reach the NBA Finals for the first time ever. In the Finals, the combination of Robinson in the post and second-year power forward Tim Duncan proved overpowering, and the Spurs beat the New York Knicks in five games to become the first former American Basketball Association team to win an NBA title. Duncan was named Finals MVP.

Robinson and Duncan were nicknamed "The Twin Towers".

Twilight years and second championship (1999–2003) 
During the 1999–00 season, Robinson averaged 17.8 points per game, 10.0 rebounds per game and 2.3 blocks per game in 80 games. The Spurs made it to the playoffs as the fourth seed, but were defeated by the Phoenix Suns in the first round of the playoffs despite Robinson's 23.5 points, 13.8 rebounds, and 3 blocks per game.

Robinson announced he would retire from basketball following the 2002–03 season.

On June 15, 2003, in the finale of Robinson's career, the Spurs won another NBA title with an 88–77 victory over the New Jersey Nets in Game 6 of the 2003 NBA Finals. During this game, Robinson scored 13 points, as well as getting 17 rebounds.  He and the year's regular season and NBA Finals MVP Tim Duncan shared Sports Illustrated magazine's 2003 Sportsmen of the Year award.

Player profile
Robinson possessed tremendous mobility in the post, speed, and ball-handling, especially for a center. With good hands on both offense and defense, Robinson was nearly unstoppable on both sides of the floor, throwing down dunks and blocking shots. He was also noted for his strong midrange jumpshot.

Robinson averaged 21.1 points per game, 10.7 rebounds per game, 3 blocks per game, and 2.5 assists per game over 987 games in his NBA career. He is also one of only a very small group of players to have scored over 20,000 career points in the NBA, as well as being one of only four players to have recorded a quadruple-double (with 34 points, 10 rebounds, 10 assists, and 10 blocks against the Detroit Pistons on February 17, 1994).

He is also one of only eight players to record 70 or more points in a single game. Robinson scored 71 points against the Los Angeles Clippers on April 24, 1994. Only Elgin Baylor (71 points), Wilt Chamberlain (70, 72, 73 twice, 78, 100 points), David Thompson (73 points), Devin Booker (70 points), Donovan Mitchell (71 points), Damian Lillard (71 points) and Kobe Bryant (81 points) have scored 70 or more points in a single game. 

Robinson is also noteworthy for his harmonious relationship with Tim Duncan. Sportswriter Chris Sheridan noted that it was rare for someone like Robinson to have welcomed and mentored Duncan as willingly as he did, and to have reduced his own role in the team's offense to accommodate a younger star. In 2022, to commemorate the NBA's 75th Anniversary The Athletic ranked their top 75 players of all time, and named Robinson as the 20th greatest player in NBA history.

NBA career statistics

Regular season

|-
| style="text-align:left;"| 1989–90
| style="text-align:left;"| San Antonio
| style="background:#cfecec;"| 82* || 81 || 36.6 || .531 || .000 || .732 || 12.0 || 2.0 || 1.7 || 3.9 || 24.3
|-
| style="text-align:left;"| 1990–91
| style="text-align:left;"| San Antonio
| style="background:#cfecec;"| 82* || 81 || 37.7 || .552 || .143 || .762 || style="background:#cfecec;"| 13.0* || 2.5 || 1.5 || 3.9 || 25.6
|-
| style="text-align:left;"| 1991–92
| style="text-align:left;"| San Antonio
| 68 || 68 || 37.7 || .551 || .125 || .701 || 12.2 || 2.7 || 2.3 || style="background:#cfecec;"| 4.5* || 23.2
|-
| style="text-align:left;"| 1992–93
| style="text-align:left;"| San Antonio
|style="background:#cfecec;"| 82* || style="background:#cfecec;"| 82* || 39.2 || .501 || .176 || .732 || 11.7 || 3.7 || 1.5 || 3.2 || 23.4
|-
| style="text-align:left;"| 1993–94
| style="text-align:left;"| San Antonio
| 80 || 80 || 40.5 || .507 || .345 || .749 || 10.7 || 4.8 || 1.7 || 3.3 || style="background:#cfecec;"| 29.8*
|-
| style="text-align:left;"| 1994–95
| style="text-align:left;"| San Antonio
| 81 || 81 || 38.0 || .530 || .300 || .774 || 10.8 || 2.9 || 1.7 || 3.2 || 27.6
|-
| style="text-align:left;"| 1995–96
| style="text-align:left;"| San Antonio
| style="background:#cfecec;"| 82* || style="background:#cfecec;"| 82* || 36.8 || .516 || .333 || .761 || 12.2 || 3.0 || 1.4 || 3.3 || 25.0
|-
| style="text-align:left;"| 1996–97
| style="text-align:left;"| San Antonio
| 6 || 6 || 24.5 || .500 || .000 || .654 || 8.5 || 1.3  || 1.0 || 1.0 || 17.7
|-
| style="text-align:left;"| 1997–98
| style="text-align:left;"| San Antonio
| 73 || 73 || 33.7 || .511 || .250 || .735 || 10.6 || 2.7 || .9 || 2.6 || 21.6
|-
| style="text-align:left; background:#afe6ba;"| †
| style="text-align:left;"| San Antonio
| 49 || 49 || 31.7 || .509 || .000 || .658 || 10.0 || 2.1 || 1.4 || 2.4 || 15.8
|-
| style="text-align:left;"| 1999–00
| style="text-align:left;"| San Antonio
| 80 || 80 || 32.0 || .512 || .000 || .726 || 9.6 || 1.8 || 1.2  || 2.3 || 17.8
|-
| style="text-align:left;"| 2000–01
| style="text-align:left;"| San Antonio
| 80 || 80 || 29.6 || .486 || .000 || .747 || 8.6 || 1.5 || 1.0 || 2.5 || 14.4
|-
| style="text-align:left;"| 2001–02
| style="text-align:left;"| San Antonio
| 78 || 78 || 29.5 || .507 || .000 || .681 || 8.3 || 1.2 || 1.1 || 1.8 || 12.2
|-
| style="text-align:left; background:#afe6ba;"| †
| style="text-align:left;"| San Antonio
| 64 || 64 || 26.2 || .469 || .000 || .710 || 7.9 || 1.0 || .8 || 1.7 || 8.5
|- class="sortbottom"
| style="text-align:center;" colspan=2| Career
| 987 || 985 || 34.7 || .518 || .250 || .736 || 10.6 || 2.5 || 1.4 || 3.0 || 21.1
|- class="sortbottom"
| style="text-align:center;" colspan=2| All-Star
| 10 || 3 || 18.4 || .588 || .000 || .695 || 6.2 || .8 || 1.3 || 1.3 || 14.1

Playoffs

|-
| style="text-align:left;"| 1990
| style="text-align:left;"| San Antonio
| 10 || 10 || 37.5 || .533 || .000 || .677 || 12.0 || 2.3 || 1.1 || 4.0 || 24.3
|-
| style="text-align:left;"| 1991
| style="text-align:left;"| San Antonio
| 4 || 4 || 41.5 || .686 || .000 || .868 || 13.5 || 2.0 || 1.5 || 3.8 || 25.8
|-
| style="text-align:left;"| 1993
| style="text-align:left;"| San Antonio
| 10 || 10 || 42.1 || .465 || .000 || .664 || 12.6 || 4.0 || 1.0 || 3.6 || 23.1
|-
| style="text-align:left;"| 1994
| style="text-align:left;"| San Antonio
| 4 || 4 || 36.5 || .411 || .000 || .741 || 10.0 || 3.5 || .8 || 2.5 || 20.0
|-
| style="text-align:left;"| 1995
| style="text-align:left;"| San Antonio
| 15 || 15 || 41.5 || .446 || .200 || .812 || 12.1 || 3.1 || 1.5 || 2.6 || 25.3
|-
| style="text-align:left;"| 1996
| style="text-align:left;"| San Antonio
| 10 || 10 || 35.3 || .516 || .000 || .667  || 10.1 || 2.4 || 1.5 || 2.5 || 23.6
|-
| style="text-align:left;"| 1998
| style="text-align:left;"| San Antonio
| 9 || 9 || 39.2 || .425 || .000 || .635 || 14.1 || 2.6 || 1.2 || 3.3 || 19.4
|-
| style="text-align:left; background:#afe6ba;"| 1999†
| style="text-align:left;"| San Antonio
| 17 || 17 || 35.3 || .483 || .000 || .722 || 9.9 || 2.5 || 1.6 || 2.4 || 15.6
|-
| style="text-align:left;"| 2000
| style="text-align:left;"| San Antonio
| 4 || 4 || 38.8 || .373 || .000 || .762 || 13.8 || 2.5 || 1.8 || 3.0 || 23.5
|-
| style="text-align:left;"| 2001
| style="text-align:left;"| San Antonio
| 13 || 13 || 31.5 || .472 || .000 || .695 || 11.8 || 1.7 || 1.3 || 2.4 || 16.6
|-
| style="text-align:left;"| 2002
| style="text-align:left;"| San Antonio
| 4 || 4 || 20.3 || .474 || .000 || .000 || 5.8  || 1.3 || .8 || .8 || 4.5
|-
| style="text-align:left; background:#afe6ba;"| 2003†
| style="text-align:left;"| San Antonio
| 23 || 23 || 23.4 || .542 || .000 || .667 || 6.6 || .9 || .8 || 1.3 || 7.8
|- class="sortbottom"
| style="text-align:center;" colspan=2| Career
| 123 || 123 || 34.3 || .479 || .100 || .708 || 10.6 || 2.3 || 1.2 || 2.5 || 18.1

National team career

David Robinson was a member of the United States national team at the 1986 FIBA World Championship, 1987 Pan American Games, 1988 Summer Olympics, 1992 Summer Olympics, and 1996 Summer Olympics. He won the gold medal at all tournaments except the 1987 Pan Am Games, where he won a silver medal, and the 1988 Summer Olympics, where he won a bronze medal.

Personal life

Robinson married Valerie Hoggatt in 1991. They have three sons, David Jr., Corey, and Justin. Corey attended Notre Dame and was a wide receiver on the football team before ending his playing career in 2016 on medical advice due to multiple concussions prior to what would have been his senior season. He was very active on campus in his final undergraduate year, having been elected student body president in February 2016 for the 2016–17 school year. Justin, a 6'8" (2.03 m) forward in basketball and a two-time all-state selection in Texas, began attending Duke in August 2015. He was initially recruited to the Duke team as a "preferred walk-on" with the opportunity to eventually earn a scholarship, but was placed on scholarship before his arrival at Duke. On September 18, 2020, Mornar Bar of Erste Liga announced that they had signed Justin, signaling the start to his professional basketball career.

Robinson became a Christian on June 8, 1991, after being encouraged to read the Bible.

In 2001, Robinson founded and funded the $9 million Carver Academy in San Antonio, a non-profit private school named for George Washington Carver to provide more opportunities for inner-city children. In 2012, the school became a public charter school and its name changed to IDEA Carver. Robinson continues to be a very active participant in the school's day-to-day activities.

In 2011, Robinson earned a Master of Arts in Administration (with concentration in organizational development) from the University of the Incarnate Word to better "understand how businesses work and how to build them."

Beyond his founding of Carver Academy, Robinson is well known as a philanthropist. Robinson and business partner Daniel Bassichis donate 10 percent of their profits to charitable causes. The winner of the NBA Community Assist Award is presented with the David Robinson Plaque.

Other ventures
In 2008, Robinson partnered with Daniel Bassichis, formerly of Goldman Sachs and a board member of The Carver Academy, to form Admiral Capital Group. Admiral Capital Group is a private equity firm whose mission is to invest in opportunities that can provide both financial and social returns. Robinson's primary motivation in starting Admiral Capital was to create a source of additional financial support for The Carver Academy. Its portfolio is worth more than $100 million and includes nine upscale hotels and office buildings across the U.S. as well as Centerplate, one of the largest hospitality companies in the world. Admiral Capital Group also partnered with Living Cities to form the Admiral Center, a non-profit created to support other athletes and entertainers with their philanthropic initiatives. Robinson is also co-owner of a Jaguar Land Rover dealership in San Juan, Texas.

Awards and honors
NBA
Two-time NBA Champion
1995 NBA MVP
1992 NBA Defensive Player of the Year
1990 NBA Rookie of the Year
1990 NBA All-Rookie First Team
Four-time All-NBA First Team
Four-time All-Defensive First Team
10-time NBA All-Star
One of 50 Greatest Players in NBA History
1994 NBA Scoring Champion
Five-time IBM Award winner
2001 NBA Sportsmanship Award
2008 NBA Shooting Stars champion
Number 50 retired by the San Antonio Spurs
2021 Elected to the NBA 75th Anniversary Team.

USA Basketball
Two-time Olympic Gold Medal winner (1992, 1996)
Olympic Bronze Medal winner (1988) 
Gold Medal at the 1986 FIBA World Championship.

NCAA
2012 NCAA Silver Anniversary Award
 Coach Wooden "Keys to Life" Award (2004)

Halls of Fame
Naismith Basketball Hall of Fame
class of 2009 – individual
class of 2010 – as a member of the "Dream Team"
U.S. Olympic Hall of Fame
class of 2008 – individual
class of 2009 – as a member of the "Dream Team"
FIBA Hall of Fame
class of 2013 - individual
class of 2017 - as a member of the "Dream Team"

Media
 2003 Sports Illustrated Sportsman of the Year
In the Classroom with David Robinson video made for distribution across American public schools in collaboration with public television producers

Other
Golden Plate Award, American Academy of Achievement (1987)

Charitable efforts
In addition to his lengthy NBA career, Robinson is also noted for his charitable work. In 1991, Robinson visited with fifth-graders at Gates Elementary School in San Antonio and challenged them to finish school and go to college. He offered a $2,000 scholarship to everyone who did. In 1998, proving even better than his word, Robinson awarded $8,000 to each of those students who had completed his challenge. In perhaps his greatest civic and charitable achievement, David and his wife, Valerie, founded the Carver Academy in San Antonio, which opened its doors in September 2001. To date, the Robinsons have donated more than $11 million to the school.

In March 2003, in recognition of his outstanding contributions to charity, the NBA renamed its award for outstanding charitable efforts in honor of Robinson. Winners of the NBA's Community Assist Award receive the David Robinson Plaque, with the inscription "Following the standard set by NBA Legend David Robinson who improved the community piece by piece." The award is given out monthly by the league to recognize players for their charitable efforts. Robinson is also the recipient of the William E. Simon Prize for Philanthropic Leadership. In 2011, in recognition of his philanthropic efforts with the Carver Academy, Robinson received the Children's Champion Award from the charitable organization Children's Hunger Fund. In 2018, Robinson became a member of the V Foundation for Cancer Research's board of directors.

See also

NBA
 List of National Basketball Association annual rebounding leaders
 List of National Basketball Association annual scoring leaders
 List of National Basketball Association career blocks leaders
 List of National Basketball Association career free throw scoring leaders
 List of National Basketball Association career playoff blocks leaders
 List of National Basketball Association career rebounding leaders
 List of National Basketball Association career scoring leaders
 List of National Basketball Association players with most blocks in a game
 List of National Basketball Association players with most points in a game
 List of National Basketball Association rookie single-season scoring leaders
 List of National Basketball Association season blocks leaders
 List of National Basketball Association top rookie scoring averages
 List of NBA players who have spent their entire career with one franchise
 Quadruple-double

College
 List of NCAA Division I men's basketball players with 13 or more blocks in a game
 List of NCAA Division I men's basketball players with 2000 points and 1000 rebounds
 List of NCAA Division I men's basketball season blocks leaders
 List of NCAA Division I men's basketball season rebounding leaders

References

External links

David Robinson @ NBA.com/History
1987 Oscar Robertson Trophy
Admiral Center

1965 births
Living people
20th-century African-American sportspeople
21st-century African-American people
1986 FIBA World Championship players
African-American basketball players
African-American Christians
All-American college men's basketball players
American Christians
American men's basketball players
Basketball players from Florida
Basketball players from San Antonio
Basketball players from Virginia
Basketball players at the 1987 Pan American Games
Basketball players at the 1988 Summer Olympics
Basketball players at the 1992 Summer Olympics
Basketball players at the 1996 Summer Olympics
Centers (basketball)
Competitors at the 1986 Goodwill Games
FIBA Hall of Fame inductees
FIBA World Championship-winning players
Medalists at the 1987 Pan American Games
Medalists at the 1988 Summer Olympics
Medalists at the 1992 Summer Olympics
Medalists at the 1996 Summer Olympics
Naismith Memorial Basketball Hall of Fame inductees
National Basketball Association All-Stars
National Basketball Association players with retired numbers
Navy Midshipmen men's basketball players
Olympic bronze medalists for the United States in basketball
Olympic gold medalists for the United States in basketball
Osbourn Park High School alumni
Pan American Games medalists in basketball
Pan American Games silver medalists for the United States
People from Key West, Florida
People from Manassas, Virginia
People from Woodbridge, Virginia
San Antonio Spurs draft picks
San Antonio Spurs players
Sportspeople from Virginia Beach, Virginia
United States men's national basketball team players
United States Navy officers
United States Navy reservists
University of the Incarnate Word alumni